Loch Scaven (Gaelic: Loch Sgamhain) is a small freshwater loch at the head of Glen Carron near the source of the River Carron, Wester Ross, Scotland. The loch tends in a northeast to southwest direction and its shore is relatively simple. At the west end there is a significant promontory known as 'Cnoc nan Sguad' which projects into the loch on the northern shore. There are two small islands in the centre of the loch opposite Cnoc nan Sguad.

The loch was surveyed on 8 August 1902 by R.M. Clark and James Murray and later charted as part of the Sir John Murray and Laurence Pullar's Bathymetrical Survey of Fresh-Water Lochs of Scotland 1897-1909.

References

Lochs of Highland (council area)
Freshwater lochs of Scotland